In functional analysis and operator theory, a bounded linear operator is a linear transformation  between topological vector spaces (TVSs)  and  that maps bounded subsets of  to bounded subsets of  

A bounded operator between normed spaces is continuous and vice versa.

The concept of a bounded linear operator has been extended from normed spaces to all topological vector spaces.

Outside of functional analysis, when a function  is called "bounded" then this usually means that its image  is a bounded subset of its codomain. A linear map has this property if and only if it is identically  
Consequently, in functional analysis, when a linear operator is called "bounded" then it is never meant in this abstract sense (of having a bounded image).

In normed vector spaces

Every bounded operator is Lipschitz continuous at

Equivalence of boundedness and continuity

A linear operator between normed spaces is bounded if and only if it is continuous.

In topological vector spaces

A subset of a TVS is called bounded (or more precisely, von Neumann bounded) if every neighborhood of the origin absorbs it. 
In a normed space (and even in a seminormed space), a subset is von Neumann bounded if and only if it is norm bounded. 
Hence, for normed spaces, the notion of a von Neumann bounded set is identical to the usual notion of a norm-bounded subset.

Continuity and boundedness

Every sequentially continuous linear operator between TVS is a bounded operator. 
This implies that every continuous linear operator between metrizable TVS is bounded. 
However, in general, a bounded linear operator between two TVSs need not be continuous.

This formulation allows one to define bounded operators between general topological vector spaces as an operator which takes bounded sets to bounded sets. 
In this context, it is still true that every continuous map is bounded, however the converse fails; a bounded operator need not be continuous. 
This also means that boundedness is no longer equivalent to Lipschitz continuity in this context.

If the domain is a bornological space (for example, a pseudometrizable TVS, a Fréchet space, a normed space) then a linear operators into any other locally convex spaces is bounded if and only if it is continuous. 
For LF spaces, a weaker converse holds; any bounded linear map from an LF space is sequentially continuous.

If  is a linear operator between two topological vector spaces and if there exists a neighborhood  of the origin in  such that  is a bounded subset of  then  is continuous. 
This fact is often summarized by saying that a linear operator that is bounded on some neighborhood of the origin is necessarily continuous. 
In particular, any linear functional that is bounded on some neighborhood of the origin is continuous (even if its domain is not a normed space).

Bornological spaces

Bornological spaces are exactly those locally convex spaces for which every bounded linear operator into another locally convex space is necessarily continuous. 
That is, a locally convex TVS  is a bornological space if and only if for every locally convex TVS  a linear operator  is continuous if and only if it is bounded.

Every normed space is bornological.

Characterizations of bounded linear operators

Let  be a linear operator between topological vector spaces (not necessarily Hausdorff). 
The following are equivalent:
 is (locally) bounded;
(Definition):  maps bounded subsets of its domain to bounded subsets of its codomain;
 maps bounded subsets of its domain to bounded subsets of its image ;
 maps every null sequence to a bounded sequence;
 A null sequence is by definition a sequence that converges to the origin.
 Thus any linear map that is sequentially continuous at the origin is necessarily a bounded linear map.
 maps every Mackey convergent null sequence to a bounded subset of 
 A sequence  is said to be Mackey convergent to the origin in  if there exists a divergent sequence  of positive real number such that  is a bounded subset of 

 maps bounded disks into bounded disks.
 maps bornivorous disks in  into bornivorous disks in 

 is sequentially continuous at some (or equivalently, at every) point of its domain.
 A sequentially continuous linear map between two TVSs is always bounded, but the converse requires additional assumptions to hold (such as the domain being bornological and the codomain being locally convex).
 If the domain  is also a sequential space, then  is sequentially continuous if and only if it is continuous.
 is sequentially continuous at the origin.

Examples

Any linear operator between two finite-dimensional normed spaces is bounded, and such an operator may be viewed as multiplication by some fixed matrix.
Any linear operator defined on a finite-dimensional normed space is bounded.
On the sequence space  of eventually zero sequences of real numbers, considered with the  norm, the linear operator to the real numbers which returns the sum of a sequence is bounded, with operator norm 1. If the same space is considered with the  norm, the same operator is not bounded.
Many integral transforms are bounded linear operators. For instance, if 

is a continuous function, then the operator  defined on the space  of continuous functions on  endowed with the uniform norm and with values in the space  with  given by the formula

is bounded. This operator is in fact a compact operator. The compact operators form an important class of bounded operators.
The Laplace operator 

(its domain is a Sobolev space and it takes values in a space of square-integrable functions) is bounded.
The shift operator on the Lp space  of all sequences  of real numbers with  
 
is bounded. Its operator norm is easily seen to be

Unbounded linear operators

The operator  that maps a polynomial to its derivative is not bounded.

Properties of the space of bounded linear operators

 If  is Banach, then so is 
 from which it follows that dual spaces are Banach.

See also

References

Bibliography

 
 Kreyszig, Erwin: Introductory Functional Analysis with Applications, Wiley, 1989
  
  

Linear operators
Operator theory
Theory of continuous functions